This is a list of schools in Division I of the National Collegiate Athletic Association (NCAA) that play football in the United States as a varsity sport and are members of the Football Championship Subdivision (FCS), known as Division I-AA from 1978 through 2005. There are 128 FCS programs in the 2023 season.  Conference affiliations are current for the 2022 season.The teams in this subdivision compete in a 24-team playoff for the NCAA Division I Football Championship. All leagues allow scholarships with the exception of the Ivy League and Pioneer Football League.

FCS programs

Transitioning from Division II
The following programs are transitioning from NCAA Division II to FCS, or have announced definitive plans to do so. Under current NCAA rules, they must have an invitation from a Division I conference to begin the transition. During the four-year transition period, they are ineligible for the FCS playoffs.

Transitioning from Division III
Normally, under current NCAA rules, teams are not allowed to reclassify directly from NCAA Division III to Division I. However, after St. Thomas was involuntarily removed from the Minnesota Intercollegiate Athletic Conference, they and their future primary conference home, the Summit League, worked with the NCAA to move directly to Division I. On July 15, 2020, it was announced that the NCAA had approved this transition, and St. Thomas has played in Division I starting with the 2021 season.

Programs moving to FCS

Former Division I FCS football programs

See also
List of NCAA Division I FCS football stadiums
 List of NCAA Division I FCS playoff appearances by team
List of NCAA Division I non-football programs
List of NCAA Division I institutions
List of NCAA Division II institutions
List of NCAA Division III institutions
List of NCAA Division I FBS football programs
List of NCAA Division II football programs
List of NCAA Division III football programs
List of NAIA football programs
List of community college football programs
List of colleges and universities with club football teams
List of NCAA Division I schools that have never sponsored football
List of defunct college football teams

References

External links
NCAA Football Championship Subdivision Sponsorship

 
FCS
NCAA Division I FCS